The American duo the White Stripes has released six studio albums, two live albums, four video albums, one extended play, 28 singles, and 20 music videos.

After three singles, the White Stripes released their self-titled debut album in June 1999. Their second studio album, the well-received De Stijl, followed in June 2000. The band's third studio album, White Blood Cells, became their breakthrough album, receiving much acclaim while pushing the band to the forefront of alternative rock. They later signed to V2 Records and released their fourth studio album Elephant in April 2003. The album was a commercial success, peaking at number six on the US Billboard 200 and reaching the top ten in multiple other countries. Elephant has been certified platinum by the Recording Industry Association of America (RIAA). The album spawned the single "Seven Nation Army", which topped the US Billboard Alternative Songs chart and became the group's first appearance on the US Billboard Hot 100, where it peaked at number 76.

The band then released their fifth studio album Get Behind Me Satan in June 2005. The album peaked at number three on the Billboard 200 and spawned three singles, including the hit single "Blue Orchid". Icky Thump, the band's sixth and final album, followed in June 2007. Icky Thump became the band's highest-charting album on the Billboard 200, peaking at number two on the chart. The album also spawned the single "Icky Thump", which peaked at number 26 on the Billboard Hot 100 and became a top 10 hit in Canada and the United Kingdom.

Albums

Studio albums

Live albums

Compilation albums

Video albums

Extended plays

Singles

Promotional singles

Split singles

Music videos

Notes

References

External links
 Official website
 The White Stripes at AllMusic
 
 

Discography
Rock music group discographies
Discographies of American artists
Alternative rock discographies